Vernon Davis (born January 31, 1984) is an American former professional football player who was a tight end in the National Football League (NFL). He played college football for the Maryland Terrapins, and was drafted by the San Francisco 49ers sixth overall in the 2006 NFL Draft. In 2009, Davis co-led the NFL in touchdown receptions and consequently earned his first of two career Pro Bowl selections.

In the 2011–12 NFL playoffs with the 49ers, Davis caught the game-winning touchdown pass from Alex Smith against the New Orleans Saints, referred to as "The Catch III". In 2015, he was traded to the Denver Broncos, where he won Super Bowl 50 with the team over the Carolina Panthers. Davis then signed with the Washington Redskins in 2016, where he played until his retirement following the 2019 season.

Early life
Davis attended Truesdell Elementary in Washington, D.C., and later attended Paul Public Charter School for middle school. However, Paul did not have a football team, and thus Davis played for neighboring MacFarland Middle School. He went on to attend Dunbar High School in Washington. He was a letterman in football, basketball, and track & field. Rated as a four-star recruit by Rivals.com, Davis was listed as the fourth-best tight end prospect of the class of 2003. At Dunbar, he was teammates with future Cleveland Browns kick return specialist and wide receiver, Josh Cribbs.

He was also a member of the 4 × 100 m (43.68s) relay squad.

High school football career
Davis played tight end and safety, but he also played wide receiver, kick returner, linebacker, and defensive end for Dunbar High School. In his senior season, he caught 21 passes for 511 yards and five touchdowns, despite missing three games with a deep bone bruise below his knee. He also caught three two-point conversions and returned two kick offs and two punts for touchdowns. As a junior, he had 35 receptions for 385 yards.

 Selected to play in the U.S. Army All-American Bowl
 A member of SuperPrep's Elite 50
 A Mid-Atlantic all-region pick by SuperPrep
 Second team All-USA by USA Today
 Ranked as the fourth-best tight end in the nation by Rivals.com
 Gatorade Player of the Year for the District of Columbia

College career

Davis enrolled in the University of Maryland, where he majored in studio art and played for the Maryland Terrapins football team.  In 2003, Davis saw the most consistent action of any true freshman, playing in all thirteen contests. He had five receptions for 87 yards (11.8 avg) and led the kickoff coverage unit with eight solo tackles.

In 2004, he played in every game, starting at H-back against Northern Illinois, Duke, Georgia Tech, Clemson, Virginia Tech, and Wake Forest. He finished second on the team with 27 catches for 441 yards and had 16.3 avg and three touchdowns.

In 2005, Davis was a Consensus All-American and All-Atlantic Coast Conference first-team selection. He was a finalist for the Mackey Award, given to the nation's top tight end. He started every game, leading the team with 51 receptions and the conference with 871 receiving yards (17.1 avg). His six touchdown catches rank tenth on the school's season-record list. His 51 receptions also rank tenth on Maryland's annual record chart while his 871 yards rank fifth. He was graded 82.5% for blocking consistency as he registered 67 knockdowns, including 18 blocks down field and had eight touchdown-resulting blocks.

Davis was heavily involved with working out in college. He set school strength records (in spring of 2005) for a tight end in the bench press (460 pounds), power-clean (380 pounds), index (824 pounds) and squat (685 pounds). He finished his college career with 1,371 yards on 83 receptions for 16.5 yards per catch, the best average of any first round tight end ever and more yards than other previous high first round tight ends such as Tony Gonzalez, Jeremy Shockey, Kyle Brady, and Kellen Winslow II.

College statistics

Professional career

San Francisco 49ers

2006 NFL Draft
Davis was selected sixth overall in the first round of the 2006 NFL Draft by the San Francisco 49ers. He joined Kellen Winslow Jr. as the fourth highest tight end ever drafted after Ron Kramer, (Green Bay, fourth overall in 1957) Mike Ditka (Chicago, fifth overall in 1961), and Riley Odoms (Denver, fifth overall in 1972).  He was the top tight end prospect in the 2006 NFL Draft, partially due to a strong performance at the scouting combine. He ran the 40-yard dash in 4.38 seconds. Davis also broad-jumped 10'08", nearly a foot farther than the next-best tight end, Marcedes Lewis.

2006 season: Rookie year
Vernon's first reception in the NFL was a 31-yard touchdown catch from quarterback Alex Smith, against the Arizona Cardinals in Week 1 on September 10, 2006. He added a career-long 52-yard touchdown against the Green Bay Packers on December 10 with a short catch followed by a long run. Davis played in ten games in the 2006 season due an injury he suffered on September 24, 2006. He sustained a hairline fracture to his left fibula, on a non-contact play against the Philadelphia Eagles, but returned on November 19 against the Seattle Seahawks. For his rookie season, Davis had 265 yards receiving on 20 catches, averaging 13.2 yards per reception. He had three receiving touchdowns.

2007 season
In Week 3 of the 2007 season, Davis was injured while attempting to catch a pass from Smith against the Pittsburgh Steelers. Davis sprained his right knee and missed the next two games.  Despite his injury and the 49ers' offensive ineptitude, Davis bettered most of the numbers from his rookie season.  Even though his yards per reception diminished, he finished the 2007 season with 52 receptions for 509 yards and four touchdowns.

2008 season
During October 2008, after catching a seven-yard pass in the third quarter against the Seahawks, Davis slapped Seahawks safety Brian Russell in the facemask, resulting in a 15-yard penalty, causing head coach Mike Singletary to bench him and then send him to the locker room for the game's remainder. After the game, Singletary then spoke his famous "I want winners" rant. This resulted in Davis changing his attitude from himself, to the team. The following game against the Cardinals, Davis leaped over a Cardinal defender and caught a pass from quarterback Shaun Hill resulting in a touchdown, his first of the season. He started all 16 regular season games, and finished the season with 31 receptions for 358 yards and two touchdowns.

2009 season
Through Week 11 of the 2009 season, Davis led the NFL with nine touchdown receptions, tied with wide receivers Larry Fitzgerald and Randy Moss. In the final game of the season, he tied the all-time record for most touchdown receptions for a tight end in a single season with 13, sharing the record set by Antonio Gates of the San Diego Chargers in 2004; that record stood until 2011, when it was broken by Rob Gronkowski of the New England Patriots. He was selected to appear in his first Pro Bowl.

2010 season

Before the 2010 season, he was awarded a five-year contract extension for $37 million with $23 million guaranteed. The deal made Davis the league's highest paid tight end. Against the Oakland Raiders in Week 6, he recorded his third straight game with a touchdown. Davis finished the season with 56 catches and 914 yards, resulting in 16.3 yards per catch. He was ranked 88th by his fellow players on the NFL Top 100 Players of 2011.

2011 season
Davis had 67 receptions for 792 yards with six touchdowns during the 2011 season, helping the 49ers win the NFC West division and make the postseason for the first time since 2002. In the playoffs in the Divisional Round against the New Orleans Saints, he had seven receptions for 180 yards, breaking Kellen Winslow's record (166) for most yards by a tight end in a playoff game. He scored two touchdowns, and on the game-winning drive, he had a critical 47-yard reception that put the 49ers in a position to tie the game. With nine seconds remaining, Davis caught the game-winning touchdown pass from Alex Smith, now referred to as "Vernon Post". Davis caught three passes for 112 yards and another two touchdowns against the New York Giants in the NFC Championship, but the 49ers lost 20–17 in overtime. He was ranked 43rd by his fellow players on the NFL Top 100 Players of 2012.

2012 season

During the 2012 season, Davis caught 41 passes for 548 yards and five touchdowns.

In the NFC Championship, Davis had five receptions for 106 yards and a touchdown in the 28–24 victory over the Atlanta Falcons. In Super Bowl XLVII, Davis had six catches for 104 yards in the narrow 34-31 loss to the Baltimore Ravens. He was ranked 38th by his fellow players on the NFL Top 100 Players of 2013.

2013 season
Davis began the 2013 season much like the 2012 playoffs ended: as a trusted and reliable target for quarterback Colin Kaepernick, catching his first touchdown pass of the season in the first quarter of the first game, at Candlestick Park on September 8, 2013, against the Green Bay Packers. He finished the 2013 season with 52 receptions for 850 receiving yards and 13 receiving touchdowns.

Davis added two touchdown receptions in the  Playoffs, one coming against the Green Bay Packers in a Wild Card Round victory, and another in a Divisional Round victory against the Carolina Panthers. He was named to the Pro Bowl. He was ranked 51st by his fellow players on the NFL Top 100 Players of 2014.

2014 season
During the 2014 season, Davis had 26 receptions for 245 yards and two touchdowns, both of which occurred in Week 1 against the Dallas Cowboys. He was dealing with ankle and back issues, which hindered him most of the time during the season.

Denver Broncos
On November 2, 2015, Davis and a 2016 seventh-round draft pick were traded from the San Francisco 49ers to the Denver Broncos for sixth-round picks in 2016 and 2017. His first game as a member of the Broncos was against his brother Vontae and the Indianapolis Colts. With Brock Osweiler as the starting quarterback, he had four receptions for 69 yards in a 17–15 win over the Chicago Bears. He added a combined four receptions for 35 yards in wins against the New England Patriots and San Diego Chargers. Davis had a season-high seven catches for 74 yards in a 15–12 loss to the Oakland Raiders. On February 7, 2016, Davis won his first Super Bowl championship after the Broncos defeated the Carolina Panthers by a score of 24–10 in Super Bowl 50. Despite ending the Super Bowl with no receptions, Davis made a key block downfield during a crucial 34-yard run by teammate C. J. Anderson, the longest rush of the game.

Washington Redskins

2016 season

On March 31, 2016, Davis signed a one-year contract with his hometown Washington Redskins. In a Week 6 game against the Philadelphia Eagles, Davis caught his first touchdown pass in over two years, helping the Redskins win their fourth straight game of the season. Davis had started the game in replacement of an injured Jordan Reed and finished with two receptions for 50 yards and a touchdown. The following week, he earned his third start in a row and finished with six receptions for 79 receiving yards in a 17–20 loss to the Detroit Lions. On October 30, 2016, Davis caught five passes for 93 yards in a 27–27 tie with the Cincinnati Bengals. During a Week 9 matchup with the Minnesota Vikings, he caught three passes for 66 yards and caught a 38-yard touchdown reception from quarterback Kirk Cousins during the Redskins' 26–20 victory. He finished the 2016 season with 44 receptions for 583 receivnig yards and two receiving touchdowns.

2017 season
On March 8, 2017, Davis signed a three-year contract extension with the Redskins. Overall, in the 2017 season, Davis finished with 43 receptions for 648 yards and three touchdowns.

2018 season
Davis recorded his first touchdown reception of the 2018 season in Week 6 against the Carolina Panthers. He finished the 2018 season with 25 receptions for 367 receiving yards and two receiving touchdowns.

2019 season
In the season-opener against the Philadelphia Eagles, Davis caught four passes for 59 yards including a 48-yard touchdown. He was placed on injured reserve on November 22, 2019, after missing most of the season with a concussion.

Retirement
Davis announced his retirement via a Fox NFL skit prior to Super Bowl LIV on February 2, 2020.

NFL career statistics

Regular season

Postseason

Personal life

Davis has a fiancée named Kayla. Davis's younger brother, Vontae Davis, is a retired cornerback that played for the Miami Dolphins & Indianapolis Colts, and infamously retired during halftime as a member of the Buffalo Bills. Davis's brother, Michael Davis, was arrested in the Petworth area of Washington, D.C. on Thursday, April 27, 2012, for two counts of assault with intent to kill while armed. Michael is suspected of three similar attacks for which there is an investigation but no charge.

Davis is an avid curling fan. He hosted an event for his charity in San Jose, California, in which the event was curling. Davis was named honorary captain of the Men's U.S. Olympic Curling team for the 2010 Winter Olympics in Vancouver.

In late 2010, Davis founded Modern Class Design (MCD) with business partner Antone Barnes.  Modern Class Design is a full-service fine arts and interior design company that offers comprehensive design services for homes and commercial spaces including interiors and landscape architecture. Davis also owns a chain of Jamba Juice franchises.

In December 2012, Davis opened Gallery 85 on Santana Row in San Jose, California. Gallery 85 is an art gallery for new and emerging artists giving them access to high-end exposure.

In October 2013, it was reported that Davis would be offering stock in his future earnings via a venture with Fantex as part of a new financial instrument being sold by Fantex. Davis planned to offer a 10% share of all future earnings from his brand marketing company to Fantex, which would then turn around and divide it into shares of a tracking stock that can be traded within their own exchange. In January 2014, the stock offering was confirmed. The proposed offering was 421,100 shares, valued at $10 per share, for a total proposed valuation worth $4.2 million.

Media appearances
In 2013, Davis made a cameo appearance in the music video for the song "Get Lo" by Ron Artest and Mike Jones.

Davis made an appearance on Pretty Wild, and Whose Line is it Anyway? in 2015.

Davis hosted the reunion and behind-the scenes special for MTV's The Challenge: Total Madness, both of which aired in July 2020. In September 2020, Davis was announced as one of the celebrities competing in the 29th season of Dancing with the Stars. He partnered with Peta Murgatroyd and was the fifth couple eliminated from the competition, lasting six weeks.

On April 28, 2021, Davis returned as the host for the two-part reunion of The Challenge: Double Agents.

In March and April 2022, Davis served as a judge for Season 1 of Domino Masters on Fox.

Movie-2023. Vernon Davis stars in the thriller "The Ritual Killer" released March 10, 2023. The movie is about a detective hunting for an international murderer committing ritualistic killings in a small Mississippi town. Davis played the ritual killer -Randoku in the movie.

References

External links

 Maryland Terrapins bio
 

1984 births
African-American players of American football
American football tight ends
Denver Broncos players
Living people
Maryland Terrapins football players
National Conference Pro Bowl players
Players of American football from Washington, D.C.
San Francisco 49ers players
Unconferenced Pro Bowl players
Washington Redskins players
Dunbar High School (Washington, D.C.) alumni
21st-century African-American sportspeople
20th-century African-American people